Totolapa is a town and one of the 119 Municipalities of Chiapas, in southern Mexico.

As of 2010, the municipality had a total population of 6,375, up from 5,513 as of 2005. It covers an area of 186.3 km2.

As of 2010, the town of Totolapa had a population of 4,596. Other than the town of Totolapa, the municipality had 30 localities, none of which had a population over 1,000.

References

Municipalities of Chiapas